The Journal of Open Source Software is a peer-reviewed open-access scientific journal covering open-source software from any research discipline. The journal was founded in 2016 by editors Arfon Smith, Kyle Niemeyer, Dan Katz, Kevin Moerman, and Karthik Ram. The editor-in-chief is Arfon Smith (Space Telescope Science Institute), and associate editors-in-chief are Dan Katz, Kevin Moerman, Kyle Niemeyer, and Krysten Thyng. The journal is a sponsored project of NumFOCUS and an affiliate of the Open Source Initiative. The journal uses GitHub as publishing platform.

The journal was established in May 2016 and in its first year published 111 articles, with more than 40 additional articles under review. They reported approximately 1200 published articles in March 2021.

The journal has been discussed in several peer-reviewed papers which describe its publishing model and its effectiveness.

Abstracting and indexing
The journal is abstracted and indexed in the Astrophysics Data System and in the DBLP computer science bibliography online database.

References

Further reading

External links

Creative Commons Attribution-licensed journals
Publications established in 2016
Continuous journals
Software engineering publications
English-language journals
Computer science journals

Open access journals